Ecotopia is a 1975 novel by Ernest Callenbach.

Ecotopia may also refer to:

 Ecotopia (album), a 1987 album by American jazz group Oregon
 Ecotopia gathering, or simply Ectopia, a training camp for the European Youth For Action
 A non-profit environmental organization headed by Srđa Popović
 A restaurant opened by South Korean writer Hur Aram
 A fictional place in the TV series seaQuest; see 
 Ecotopia, one of The Nine Nations of North America, as defined by Joel Garreau

See also
 
 Ectopia (disambiguation)
 Utopia (disambiguation)